Guillemette du Luys (fl. 1479), was a French surgeon in service of king Louis XI of France. She was one of two women to have served as royal physicians in France.

She is documented as a surgeon in service of the king in the year of 1479. She is described as in charge of the "lower stews" (estuver... par dessoubs), and may have been active as a phlebotomist.  Her position was unusual for her sex. While there had been many female physicians in Paris in the 13th century, new laws in England, France and Spain from the mid-14th century had limited and restricted the existence of female medical practitioners, and Guillemette du Luys was reportedly the first female surgeon known in Paris since Peretta Peronne, who was tried for unlawful practice in the 1400s. She was furthermore the only contemporary female physician in France, except for Martinette, who was permitted to treat the poor of Dijon.

See also
 Magistra Hersend

References

Further reading
 Biographical Index of the Middle Ages
 Irene M. Franck, David M. Brownstone, Women's world: a timeline of women in history, 1995
 Jean Porcher, Humanisme et renaissance, 1938
 Monica H. Green, Making Women's Medicine Masculine: The Rise of Male Authority in Pre-Modern Gynaecology, 2008

Date of birth unknown
Date of death unknown
Year of birth unknown
Year of death unknown

French surgeons
Medieval women physicians
15th-century French physicians
15th-century French people
French courtiers
15th-century French women
15th-century French scientists
French women physicians
Medieval surgeons